Kuku Emmanuel Fidelis (born 10 March 1999) is a Nigerian professional footballer who plays as a winger for Portuguese club Vizela.

Playing career
Fidelis is a youth product of the Nigerian Gee-Lec Academy, before moving to the academies of Vizela, and Porto. After starting his senior career with Vizela, he transferred to Boavista on 31 August 2020. He made his professional debut with Boavista in a 2–0 Primeira Liga win over F.C. Paços de Ferreira on 16 April 2021.

International career
Fidelis represented the Nigeria U17s for 2017 Africa U-17 Cup of Nations qualification matches.

References

External links
 
 

1999 births
Living people
Sportspeople from Kaduna
Nigerian footballers
Nigeria youth international footballers
Association football wingers
F.C. Vizela players
Boavista F.C. players
Campeonato de Portugal (league) players
Primeira Liga players
Nigerian expatriate footballers
Nigerian expatriate sportspeople in Portugal
Expatriate footballers in Portugal